The Legend of Zelda: Majora's Mask is a 2000 action-adventure game developed and published by Nintendo for the Nintendo 64 home console. It was released worldwide in 2000 as a main installment in The Legend of Zelda series and was the second to use 3D graphics, following 1998's The Legend of Zelda: Ocarina of Time, to which it is a direct sequel. Designed by a creative team led by Eiji Aonuma, Yoshiaki Koizumi, and Shigeru Miyamoto, Majora's Mask was completed in less than two years. It featured enhanced graphics and several gameplay changes from its predecessor, though it reused a number of elements and character models, which the game's creators called a creative decision made necessary by time constraints.

The story of Majora's Mask takes place two months after the events of Ocarina of Time. It follows Link, who on a personal quest, ends up in Termina, a world parallel to Hyrule. Upon reaching Termina, Link learns that the world is endangered as the moon will fall into the world in three days and becomes embroiled into a quest to prevent the end of the world.

The game introduced several novel concepts, revolving around the perpetually repeating three-day cycle and the use of various masks that can transform Link into different beings. As the player progresses through the game, Link also learns to play numerous melodies on his Ocarina, which allow him to control the flow of time or open passages to four temple dungeons. Characteristic of the Zelda series, completion of the game involves successfully traversing through several dungeons, each of which contain a number of complex puzzles and enemies. On the Nintendo 64, Majora's Mask—unlike Ocarina of Time—required the Expansion Pak, which provided additional memory for more refined graphics and greater flexibility in generating on-screen characters.

Majora's Mask earned widespread acclaim from critics and is widely considered one of the best video games ever made. It received praise for the gameplay, graphics, story and has been noted for its darker tone and themes compared to the other titles in the franchise as well for its distinct art style and level design. While the game only sold about half as many copies as its predecessor, it generated a substantial cult following. The game was rereleased as part of The Legend of Zelda: Collector's Edition for the GameCube in 2003, for the Wii's Virtual Console service in 2009, for the Wii U's Virtual Console service in 2016, and for the Nintendo Switch Online + Expansion Pack in 2022. An enhanced remake for the Nintendo 3DS, The Legend of Zelda: Majora's Mask 3D, was released in 2015.

Gameplay

The gameplay of Majora's Mask expands on that of Ocarina of Time. It retains the concept of dungeon puzzles and ocarina songs and introduces new elements including character transformations and a three-day cycle. As in previous installments, Link can perform basic actions such as walking, running and limited jumping (although sometimes Link performs flips), and must use items to battle enemies and solve puzzles. Link's main weapon is a sword, and other weapons and items are available—Link can block or reflect attacks with a shield, stun enemies by throwing Deku Nuts, attack from a distance with a bow and arrow, and use bombs to destroy obstacles and damage enemies. He can also latch onto objects or paralyze enemies with the Hookshot. Magic power allows attacks such as magical arrows or spin attacks and the use of special items such as the Lens of Truth, which allows the player to see invisible objects and disappears fake objects.

Similar to the other games, the player has to progress through a variety of dungeons. These dungeons include numerous puzzles that the player needs to solve with the equipment and/or mechanics set in the dungeon depending on its theme. Similar to A Link to the Past and its predecessor, which is now a tradition into the series, the player can obtain a map and a compass for assistance, although they are optional. The player also has to find a key to unlock the boss' room. New to Majora's Mask are little fairies, which are collectibles. Fifteen are set through a dungeon and the player has to find them all and put them back in their respective fountain to gain a new ability, such as a greater defense or an upgraded "Spin Attack".

Masks and transformations

While the masks in Ocarina of Time are limited to an optional side-quest, they play a central role in Majora's Mask, which has twenty-four masks in total.

Link can transform himself at will into different creatures: the Deku Mask transforms Link into a Deku Scrub, the Goron Mask into a Goron, and the Zora Mask into a Zora. Each form features unique abilities: Deku Link can perform a spin attack, shoot bubbles, skip on water, and fly for a short time by launching from Deku Flowers; Goron Link can roll at high speeds (and grow spikes at higher speeds), punch with deadly force, pound the ground with his massive, rock-like body, walk in lava without taking damage, and weigh down heavy switches; Zora Link can swim faster than normal Link, throw boomerang-like fins from his arms, generate a force field, and walk on the bottoms of bodies of water. Many areas can be accessed only by use of these abilities.

Link and his three transformations receive different reactions from non-player characters (NPCs). For instance, Goron and Zora Link can exit Clock Town at will, but Deku Link is not permitted to leave due to his childlike appearance. Animals also interact differently to Link's four forms. They are indifferent to Link's normal form, attack Deku Link, are frightened by Goron Link, and chase Zora Link.

The final obtainable mask is the Fierce Deity's Mask. Even though the use of this mask is strictly limited to boss battles, it is possible to wear it anywhere using a glitch. Upon donning this mask, Link grows to nearly two-and-a-half times his normal height and gains white clothes and war paint on his face. Fierce Deity Link's sword is helix-shaped and shoots beams at enemies.

Other masks provide situational benefits. For example, the Great Fairy's Mask helps retrieve stray fairies in the four temples, the Bunny Hood increases Link's movement speed, and the Stone Mask renders Link invisible to most NPCs and enemies. Less valuable masks are usually involved only in optional side-quests or specialized situations. Examples include the Postman's Hat, which grants Link access to items in mailboxes, and Kafei's Mask, which initiates a long side-quest to receive the Couple's Mask.

Three-day cycle

Majora's Mask imposes a time limit of three days (72 hours) in-game time, which is about 54 minutes in real time. An on-screen clock tracks the day and time. Link can return to 6:00 am of the first day by playing the Song of Time on the Ocarina of Time. If he does not before the 72 hours expire, then the moon will destroy Termina and Link will lose everything he accomplished during these three days. A real-time countdown will begin when only 6 hours remain. However, returning to the first day saves the player's progress and major accomplishments permanently, such as the collection of maps, masks, music, and weapons. Cleared puzzles, keys, and minor items will be lost, as well as any rupees not in the bank, and almost all characters will have no recollection of meeting Link. Link can slow down time or warp to the next morning or evening by playing the Inverted Song of Time and the Song of Double Time. Owl statues scattered across certain major areas of the world allow the player to temporarily save their progress after activation and also provide warp points to quickly navigate the world.

Other uses for music include manipulating the weather, teleporting between owl statues spread throughout Termina, and unlocking the four temples. Each transformation mask uses a different instrument: Deku Link plays a multi-horn instrument called the "Deku Pipes", Goron Link plays a set of bongo drums tied around his waist, and Zora Link plays a guitar made from a large fish skeleton. Jackson Guitars created a limited edition 7-string replica of this guitar that was the grand prize in a contest in Nintendo Power, known as the "Jackson Zoraxe".

During the three-day cycle, many non-player characters follow fixed schedules that Link can track using the Bombers' Notebook. The notebook tracks the twenty characters in need of help, such as a soldier to whom Link delivers medicine and a couple whom Link reunites. Blue bars on the notebook's timeline indicate when characters are available for interaction, and icons indicate that Link has received items, such as masks, from the characters.

Plot

Setting and characters

The Legend of Zelda: Majora's Mask is set in Termina, a land parallel to Hyrule, the main setting of most Zelda games. Termina is a world that is trapped within a perpetual three day limbo, between the time when Link first enters Termina at the beginning of Majora's Mask, and when a large falling moon crashes into the land causing its apocalyptic destruction and killing its inhabitants 72 hours later. The Skull Kid, a former inhabitant of Hyrule, obtains Majora's Mask and wills Termina into existence, due to the evil power of the mask combined with Skull Kid's heavy heart. The residents of Termina, who are created from the Skull Kid's memories, resemble the residents of Hyrule featured in Ocarina of Time, and possess their own unique culture and myths. One of these myths tells of how Termina was divided into four quadrants by four magic giants that live in each of the land's regions and how harmony was restored to the land. The giants were friends of an imp, who repeatedly wronged the people out of anger caused by feelings of neglect. The giants, who were worshipped like gods, urged the imp to return to the heavens and restore peace to the world. This myth emphasises that Hyrule is Termina's heaven and that the imp is the Skull Kid. Termina is depicted as a darker, more unsettling version of Hyrule, in which landmarks are familiar and side characters who previously appeared in Ocarina of Time are presented with individual stories of misfortune.

At the center of Termina lies Clock Town, which features a large clock tower that counts down the days before the Carnival of Time—a festival where the people of Termina pray for good luck and harvests. Termina Field surrounds Clock Town; beyond lie a swamp, mountain range, bay, and canyon in each of the four cardinal directions. Each of the areas contains a temple and is home to a unique race of creatures who have in some way been impacted by the misdeeds of the Skull Kid.

The Southern Swamp contains the Deku Palace and the Woodfall Temple, an ancient shrine that contains monsters and a giant masked jungle warrior, Odolwa, who has been poisoning the swamp. The Snowhead mountain range, north of Clock Town, is the site of the Goron village. Normally a lush pine forest region most of the year, the area has been experiencing an unusually long winter caused by the mechanical monster Goht in Snowhead Temple. The western area of Termina, the Great Bay, is home to the Zora and Gerudo civilizations. A giant masked fish, Gyorg, is generating storms and contaminating the water surrounding the Great Bay Temple. The desolate Ikana Canyon, to the east of Clock Town, is the site of a former kingdom. It is inhabited mainly by the undead, except for a ghost researcher and his daughter Pamela, as well as a thief named Sakon. Two giant masked insectoid serpents known as Twinmold are casting a dark aura from their nest in Stone Tower Temple, causing the corpses of former citizens and soldiers to be revived as undead monsters.

Romani Ranch, southwest of Clock Town, is the site of a ranch which houses Romani, her older sister, Cremia, Grog, and Mamamu Yan. In a sidequest, Link can help Romani protect the ranch's cows from being abducted by alien-like creatures of unknown origin colloquially dubbed "Ghosts", "Them", and "They".

After the final confrontation with Skull Kid, Link is transported to the inside of the moon, which is portrayed as a green field with a single, large tree in the center with five children donning the masks of the game's four preceding bosses playing underneath it and a fifth donning Majora's mask, who triggers the game's final battle, sitting against it. The children are never named nor otherwise referenced in the game, though they resemble the Traveling Mask Salesman.

Plot
Majora's Mask is set two months after Ocarina of Time with Link on a personal quest: searching for his departed fairy, Navi. The game begins as Link, during his search, is ambushed by Skull Kid wearing a mysterious mask and his two fairy companions, siblings Tatl and Tael. They steal both Epona and the Ocarina of Time. Link pursues them and falls into a trap; Skull Kid curses Link as a Deku Scrub, and Tatl is left behind. Having no other choice, Tatl guides Link to Clock Town. On their way, they meet the Happy Mask Salesman, who owns Skull Kid's mask and can break Link's curse if the mask is returned. Link agrees, and in a deadline of three days, finds Skull Kid. Link recovers the Ocarina of Time but fails to get the mask. As the moon dangerously approaches, Tael instructs Link to go to four locations in Termina. Link plays the Ocarina and goes back three days in time.

The Happy Mask Salesman breaks Link's curse and explains Skull Kid's mask is Majora's Mask, a mask containing a powerful evil that can bring the end of days. Link then begins his quest by going to the regions that Tael mentioned: Woodfall, Snowhead, the Great Bay, and the Ikana Canyon. Link learns that the four locations are cursed by Skull Kid's use of the mask; In Woodfall, the water is poisoned and the Deku princess was kidnapped. Snowhead has been plagued with an eternal winter, leaving the Gorons to starvation. Great Bay's ocean has been contaminated, turning its creatures into monsters. In Ikana, inhabitants are terrorized by a curse that brings the dead back to life. As he progresses, Link learns that Skull Kid cursed Termina as revenge for feeling abandoned by his Giant friends when they became Termina's guardians. Tatl and Tael befriended and accompanied him in his games that would eventually lead to the theft of the mask, which has been corrupting him ever since. Under the mask's influence, Skull Kid intends to force the moon to crash into Termina at the beginning of the Carnival of Time. Link eventually lifts the curses, liberating the Giants one by one.

On the eve of the Carnival, Link summons the Giants and they stop the moon from crashing. Majora's Mask leaves Skull Kid and goes inside the moon, with Link in pursuit. Link defeats Majora and the moon disappears. Link, the fairies, and the Giants all make amends with Skull Kid, while the Happy Mask Salesman recovers the now powerless Majora's Mask. The Carnival of Time begins with its attendants celebrating Link's actions that came to fruition. In a nearby forest, Skull Kid draws himself and his friends on a tree trunk.

Development
Following the release of The Legend of Zelda: Link's Awakening in 1993, fans waited five years for Ocarina of Time, the active development of which took four years. By reusing the game engine and graphics from Ocarina of Time, a smaller team required only one year to finish Majora's Mask, with development having started in January 1999. The game was developed by a team led by Eiji Aonuma, Shigeru Miyamoto, and Yoshiaki Koizumi. According to Aonuma, they were "faced with the very difficult question of just what kind of game could follow Ocarina of Time and its worldwide sales of seven million units", and as a solution, came up with the three-day system to "make the game data more compact while still providing deep gameplay". According to Aonuma, the concept of time repeatedly looping was inspired by the 1998 film Run Lola Run. Miyamoto and Koizumi came up with the story that served as the basis for the script written by Mitsuhiro Takano. The idea of the "three-day system" came from Miyamoto and Koizumi. The development team's main goal was to make a refined, compact successor to Ocarina of Time that would allow players to have a different experience each time they played it.

Majora's Mask first appeared in the media in May 1999, when Famitsu stated that a long-planned Zelda expansion for the 64DD was under development in Japan. This project was tentatively titled "Ura Zelda" ("ura" translates roughly to "hidden" or "behind"). This expansion would take Ocarina of Time and alter the level designs, similar to how the "master quest" expanded upon the original Legend of Zelda. In June, Nintendo announced that "Zelda: Gaiden", which roughly translates to "Zelda: Side Story", would appear as a playable demo at the Nintendo Space World exhibition on August 27, 1999. The media assumed that Zelda: Gaiden was the new working title for Ura Zelda.

Screenshots of Zelda: Gaiden released in August 1999 show unmistakable elements of the final version of Majora's Mask, such as the large clock that dominates the center of Clock Town, the timer at the bottom of the screen, and the Goron Mask. Story and gameplay details revealed later that month show that the story concept as well as the use of transformation masks were already in place.

That same month, Miyamoto confirmed that Ura Zelda and Zelda: Gaiden were separate projects. It was unclear if Zelda: Gaiden was an offshoot of Ura Zelda or if the two were always separate. Ura Zelda might have become Ocarina of Time Master Quest outside Japan, and was released on a bonus disc for the GameCube given to those who pre-ordered The Wind Waker in the US and bundled with the GameCube game in Europe.

In November, Nintendo announced a "Holiday 2000" release date for Zelda: Gaiden. By March 2000, what ultimately became the final titles were announced: Zelda no Densetsu Mujura no Kamen in Japan and The Legend of Zelda: Majora's Mask elsewhere.

Technical differences from Ocarina of Time 

Majora's Mask runs on an upgraded version of the engine used in Ocarina of Time and requires the use of the Nintendo 64's 4 MB Expansion Pak, making it one of the two games that require said peripheral; the other being Donkey Kong 64. IGN theorized this requirement is due to Majora's Masks possible origin as a Nintendo 64DD game, which would necessitate an extra 4 MB of RAM. The use of the Expansion Pak allows for greater draw distances, more accurate dynamic lighting, more detailed texture mapping and animation, complex framebuffer effects such as motion blur, and more characters displayed on-screen. This expanded draw distance allows the player to see much farther and eliminates the need for the fog effect and "cardboard panorama" seen in Ocarina of Time, which were used to obscure distant areas. IGN considered the texture design to be one of the best created for the Nintendo 64, saying that although some textures have a low resolution, they are "colorful and diverse", which gives each area "its own unique look".

Music 

The music was written by longtime series composer Koji Kondo, and Toru Minegishi. The soundtrack largely consists of reworked music from Ocarina of Time, complemented with other traditional Zelda music such as the "Overworld Theme" and new material. Kondo describes the music as having "an exotic Chinese-opera sound". As the three-day cycle progresses, the theme song of Clock Town changes between three variations, one for each day. IGN relates the shift in music to a shift in the game's atmosphere, saying that the quickened tempo of the Clock Town music on the second day conveys a sense of time passing quickly. The two-disc soundtrack was released in Japan on June 23, 2000, and features 112 tracks from the game.

Reception 

In Japan, 314,044 copies of The Legend of Zelda: Majora's Mask were sold during its first week on sale, eventually selling 601,542 copies by the end of 2000. In Europe, it was the eighth highest-grossing game of 2000 with €27,000,000 or  grossed that year. Ultimately, 3.36 million copies were sold worldwide for the Nintendo 64.

Like its predecessor, Majora's Mask received critical acclaim. The game holds a score of 95/100 on review aggregator Metacritic, indicating "universal acclaim". Opinions were favorable regarding how the game compared with Ocarina of Time, which is often cited as one of the greatest video games of all time. Tampa Bay Times, who previously called Ocarina of Time "the Gone With the Wind of video gaming", claimed Majora's Mask outdid its predecessor. Reviewers praised its visuals, gameplay, writing, and soundtrack. Greg Orlando reviewed the Nintendo 64 version of the game for Next Generation, rating it four stars out of five, calling it "another beautiful Link in the chain".

Game Informer called the three-day cycle "one of the most inventive premises in all of gaming", and also stated that "[w]ithout question, Majora's Mask is the finest adventure the Nintendo 64 has to offer". It is often regarded as the darkest and most original game in the Legend of Zelda series. Edge magazine referred to Majora's Mask as "the oddest, darkest and saddest of all Zelda games". N64 Magazine ended their review by saying that "it was told that Majora's Mask should cower in the shadow of Ocarina of Time. Instead, it shines just as brightly", awarding the game 96%. IGN described Majora's Mask as "The Empire Strikes Back of Nintendo 64...it's the same franchise, but it's more intelligent, darker, and tells a much better storyline". GamePro characterized the story as "surreal and spooky, deep, and intriguing" and the game as living proof that the N64 still has its magic. Majora's Mask has also placed highly in publication and fan-voted polls.

However, some critics felt that Majora's Mask was not as accessible as Ocarina of Time. Tampa Bay Times argued it was the hardest game in the Zelda series simply because of its 3-day deadline. GameSpot, which awarded Ocarina of Time 10/10, only gave Majora's Mask 8.3/10, writing that some might find the focus on minigames and side quests tedious and slightly out of place, and that the game was much more difficult than its predecessor. GameRevolution wrote that it "takes a little longer to get into this Zelda", but also that "there are moments when the game really hits you with all its intricacies and mysteries, and that makes it all worthwhile".

Majora's Mask was a runner-up for GameSpots annual "Best Nintendo 64 Game" award, losing to Perfect Dark. It was also nominated for "Best Adventure Game" among console games. The game was ranked 155th in Electronic Gaming Monthly'''s "The Greatest 200 Video Games of Their Time" in 2006.

 Legacy 
In 2003, Nintendo rereleased Majora's Mask on the GameCube as part of The Legend of Zelda: Collector's Edition, a special promotional disc which also contained three other The Legend of Zelda games and a twenty-minute demo of The Legend of Zelda: The Wind Waker. This disc came bundled with a GameCube console, as part of a subscription offer to Nintendo Power magazine, or through Nintendo's official website. The Collector's Edition was also available through the Club Nintendo reward program, with a bonus discount offered in 2004 with the purchase of The Legend of Zelda: Four Swords Adventures during the month long .

Similar to other GameCube rereleases, versions of the games featured in the Collector's Edition are emulations of the originals using GameCube hardware. The only differences are minor adjustments to button icons to resemble the buttons on the GameCube controller. Majora's Mask also boots with a disclaimer that some of the original sounds from the game may cause problems due to their emulation. Aside from these deliberate changes, GameSpot's Ricardo Torres found that the frame rate "appears choppier" and noted inconsistent audio. The GameCube version also features a slightly higher native resolution than its Nintendo 64 counterpart, as well as progressive scan.Majora's Mask was released on the Wii's Virtual Console service in Europe and Australia on April 3, 2009, and Japan on April 7. It was later released in North America on May 18 and commemorated as the 300th Virtual Console game available for purchase in the region. During January 2012, Club Nintendo members could download Majora's Mask onto the Wii Console for 150 coins. A similar deal was offered at the end of Club Nintendo in 2015. The game was released for the Wii U's Virtual Console service in Europe on June 23, 2016 and in North America on November 24. Majora's Mask was released through the Nintendo Switch Online Expansion Pack service on February 25, 2022.

The game served as the primary inspiration for the popular 2010s web serial and web series Ben Drowned by Alexander D. Hall, which helped define the creepypasta genre of online storytelling. Content based on Majora's Mask has also appeared in the Super Smash Bros. series. A stage based on the Great Bay Coast area of the game, titled "Great Bay", appears in Super Smash Bros. Melee and Super Smash Bros. Ultimate. Skull Kid also appears as a computer-controlled Assist Trophy in Super Smash Bros. for Nintendo 3DS and Wii U and Ultimate, while the Moon appears as an Assist Trophy in Ultimate as well. A Skull Kid-themed mask is available as customizable headgear to be worn by Mii characters in Nintendo 3DS and Wii U and Ultimate.

A fan-made patch for the Nintendo 64 version entitled N64HD—featuring enhanced graphics, textures, and lighting—was released in 2021. Having been in development for five years, it overhauls over 6000 in-game textures.

 Nintendo 3DS remake 

After the release of The Legend of Zelda: Ocarina of Time 3D, a remake of Ocarina of Time for the Nintendo 3DS, director Eiji Aonuma suggested that a Majora's Mask remake was dependent on interest and demand. Following this news, a fan campaign called "Operation Moonfall" was launched to promote a remake of Majora's Mask for the 3DS. The campaign name is a reference to a similar fan-based movement, Operation Rainfall, set up to persuade Nintendo of America to localize a trio of role-playing games for the Wii. The petition reached 10,000 signatures within five days. In response to an email sent by a customer, a representative of Nintendo of America revealed that they had no official announcements of Majora's Mask remake, but they were interested to hear about what fans wanted, acknowledging their campaign. Both Zelda producer Eiji Aonuma and Miyamoto expressed interest in developing the remake in the future.

A remake of Majora's Mask, titled The Legend of Zelda: Majora's Mask 3D, was released worldwide in February 2015. Like Ocarina of Time 3D before it, the remake features improved character models and stereoscopic 3D graphics, along with altered boss battles, an additional fishing minigame, and support for New Nintendo 3DS systems. To update the game for modern audiences, Aonuma and the team at Grezzo compiled a list of gameplay moments that stuck out to them as unreasonable for players, colloquially dubbed the "what in the world" list. The game's release coincided with the launch of the New Nintendo 3DS system in North America and Europe. A special edition New Nintendo 3DS XL model was launched alongside the game, with the European release featuring a pin badge, double-sided poster, and steelbook case. The UK retailer Game offered a Majora's Mask''-themed paperweight as a pre-order bonus for the standard edition of the game.

Notes

References

External links
 
 

2000 video games
Apocalyptic video games
Cancelled 64DD games
Video games about impact events
Interactive Achievement Award winners
Fiction set on moons
Nintendo 64 games
Nintendo Entertainment Analysis and Development games
GameCube games
Fiction about giants
Single-player video games
Majora's Mask
Dark fantasy video games
Video games about shapeshifting
Video games about time loops
Video games developed in Japan
Video games about parallel universes
Video games produced by Shigeru Miyamoto
Video games scored by Koji Kondo
Video games scored by Toru Minegishi
Video games set on the Moon
Virtual Console games for Wii
Virtual Console games for Wii U
Video games about time travel
Video games with time manipulation
Nintendo Switch Online games
Portal fantasy
D.I.C.E. Award for Action Game of the Year winners
D.I.C.E. Award for Adventure Game of the Year winners